Patrick E. Murray (born August 20, 1969) is a Canadian former professional ice hockey player.

Playing career
Born in Stratford, Ontario, Murray was drafted 35th overall by the Philadelphia Flyers in the 1988 NHL Entry Draft from Michigan State Spartans. He spent much of his tenure with the Flyers' American Hockey League affiliate the Hershey Bears, but did play in 25 NHL games over two seasons. He also played in the International Hockey League for the Phoenix Roadrunners and the Kalamazoo Wings. A brief spell in the East Coast Hockey League with the Knoxville Cherokees was followed with a second time with the Kalamazoo Wings and then three seasons in Germany before he retired in 1998.

Career statistics

Awards and honours

External links
 

1969 births
Living people
Canadian ice hockey left wingers
Essen Mosquitoes players
HDD Olimpija Ljubljana players
Hershey Bears players
Sportspeople from Stratford, Ontario
Kalamazoo Wings (1974–2000) players
Knoxville Cherokees players
Michigan State Spartans men's ice hockey players
Philadelphia Flyers draft picks
Philadelphia Flyers players
Phoenix Roadrunners (IHL) players
Ice hockey people from Ontario
Canadian expatriate ice hockey players in Slovenia